Montasser Lahtimi (born 1 April 2001) is a Moroccan professional footballer who plays as a winger for Süper Lig club Trabzonspor.

Professional career
Lahtimi began his senior career with FUS Rabat in 2019. He transferred to the Turkish club Trabzonspor on 18 August 2022 for a fee of €600K, signing a 3+1 year contract.

International career
Lahtimi is a youth international for Morocco. He played for the Morocco U17s at the 2021 Africa U-20 Cup of Nations and helped the team get to the quarterfinals. On 25 November 2021, he was called up to a training camp with the Moroco U23s. He was called up to the Morocco A' national team for the 2021 Islamic Solidarity Games.

References

External links
 

2001 births
Living people
Moroccan footballers
Morocco youth international footballers
Fath Union Sport players
Trabzonspor footballers
Botola players
Süper Lig players
Association football wingers
Moroccan expatriate footballers
Moroccan expatriate sportspeople in Turkey
Expatriate footballers in Turkey